The 2013 NCAA Division I Women's Lacrosse Championship was the 32nd annual single-elimination tournament to determine the national champion of Division I NCAA women's college lacrosse. The semifinal and championship rounds were played at Villanova Stadium (the home of  Villanova Wildcats football) from May 24–26, 2013.

The University of North Carolina defeated their ACC rival University of Maryland to win their first ever women's lacrosse championship.

Tournament field
All NCAA Division I women's lacrosse programs were eligible for this championship, and a total of 26 teams were invited to participate. 13 teams qualified automatically by winning their conference tournaments while the remaining 13 teams qualified at-large based on their regular season records.

Seeds

1. Maryland (19-0)
2. Northwestern (17-2)
3. North Carolina (14-3)
4. Syracuse (16-3)
5. Florida (17-2)
6. Georgetown (13-5)
7. Penn State (12-6)
8. Navy (18-1)

Teams

Tournament bracket

References

NCAA Division I Women's Lacrosse Championship
NCAA Division I Women's Lacrosse Championship
NCAA Women's Lacrosse Championship
NCAA Division I Women's Lacrosse Championship